Jan Vincent may refer to:

Jan-Michael Vincent (1944–2019), American actor
Jan Vincent-Rostowski (born 1951), Polish-British economist and politician
Jan Vincent-Rudzki (born 1955), British founding editor of the magazine TV Zone

See also
Jan Vincents Johannessen (born 1941), Norwegian physician and composer
John Vincent (disambiguation)